The 1955 Denver Pioneers football team represented the University of Denver as a member of the Skyline Conference during the 1955 college football season. In their first season under head coach John Roning, the Pioneers compiled an 8–2 record (5–2 against conference opponents), tied for third in the Skyline, and outscored opponents by a total of 310 to 89.

Schedule

References

Denver
Denver Pioneers football seasons
Denver Pioneers football